was a Japanese photographer. He was a member of the Manshū Shashin Sakka Kyōkai.

References

Nihon shashinka jiten / 328 Outstanding Japanese Photographers. Kyoto: Tankōsha, 2000. . 

Japanese photographers
1898 births
1983 deaths